Senna Gammour ( Guemmour; born 28 December 1979), also known mononymously as Senna, is a German singer, television personality and presenter. She was a member of the girl group Monrose.

Early life
Gammour was born in Frankfurt to a Moroccan mother and Algerian father. She grew up in the housing estate of Frankfurt-Nordweststadt. Gammour's father died in 1992. Shaped by her life in the urban area, Gammour became interested in hip hop culture and music; she also worked as a waitress and started a commercial training in the wholesale and export trades.

Career

In 2003, Gammour auditioned for the television show Popstars – Das Duell, but was eliminated during the callback. In 2006, she auditioned again, this time for Popstars – Neue Engel braucht das Land, where she made it throughout the entire competition and became a member of the girl group Monrose. The group turned out to be very popular, attaining two number-one singles on the German Singles Charts ("Shame" and "Hot Summer") and landing a total of seven top 10 hits, of which six of them were attained before 2008.

In 2007, Gammour collaborated with German musician Dieter Falk on the track "Kein schöner Land", from his album Volkslieder. The following year, she was featured on German rapper Kool Savas' single "Melodie", which reached a peak position of 68 on the Official German Charts.

On 9 September 2008, she, along with Oliver Petszokat, began hosting the German edition of The Singing Bee on television channel ProSieben; the program ran until early 2009. Furthermore, she served as a judge on the German talent show Mascerade.

On 25 November 2010, Monrose announced that they would disband in early 2011. Gammour would later continue her career as a television presenter by co-hosting the German version of Deal With It (known as Iss oder Quizz) with Lutz van der Horst; the program aired on ZDFneo for 56 episodes between March 2011 and March 2012.

Gammour served as a judge on the tenth season of Popstars, which aired on ProSieben in the summer of 2012.

During 2012 and 2018, Gammour participated in many TV shows like Promi Shopping Queen, Wild Girls – Auf High Heels durch Afrika, Grill den Hessler or Genial daneben – Das Quiz. In 2017, she started her own comedy tour Liebeskummer ist ein Arschloch!, which became successful. One year later, she began touring her second show called No More Fuckboys! and performed in Germany, Austria and Switzerland. 

During the next three years, she published two books (Liebeskummer ist ein Arschloch – Nie wieder Fuckboys and In dein Gesicht – Erfolg ist die beste Rache!) and released her singles "Fuckboy", "Anders Real" and "Wahnsinnig".

Discography

With Monrose

Singles

As lead artist

As featured artist

Filmography

Film

Television

Webseries

Podcast

Books 
 Liebeskummer ist ein Arschloch – Nie wieder Fuckboys [2019]
 In dein Gesicht – Erfolg ist die beste Rache! [2020]

Tours

Headliner 
 Liebeskummer ist ein Arschloch! (2017-2018)
 No More Fuckboys! (2019)
 No More Fuckboys! 2.0 (2020) [some dates cancelled due COVID-19 pandemic]
 Best Friends Tour (2022) [cancelled due COVID-19 pandemic]
 Die Akte Ex Tour (TBA)

Awards and nominations

References

External links

1979 births
English-language singers from Germany
German women pop singers
German people of Algerian descent
German people of Moroccan descent
Living people
Monrose members
Musicians from Frankfurt
Warner Music Group artists
21st-century German women singers